Comenius University in Bratislava is the largest university in Slovakia, with most of its faculties located in Bratislava. It was founded in 1919, shortly after the creation of Czechoslovakia. It is named after Jan Amos Comenius, a 17th-century Czech teacher and philosopher.

In 2020, Comenius University had more about 23,000 students and 2,500 faculty members. As are most universities in Slovakia, it is funded mostly by the government.

History
The Comenius University was established in 1919 with assistance from the more established University of Prague. It was meant to replace the former Elisabeth University which was located in Bratislava since 1912 as the latter had been forcefully disbanded in 1919 by Samuel Zoch, plenipotentiary župan of Slovakia, after Hungarian professors refused to take an oath of allegiance at that time in the First Czechoslovak Republic. This had caused the majority of the university's professors (and some of the students) to take refuge in Budapest, where the Elisabeth University was reestablished. It had been later moved to Pécs and renamed to University of Pécs. This persecution of former (predominantly Hungarian) pillars of education in Bratislava necessitated the recruitment of Czech academicians. Therefore, many professors of the newly established university, including its first rector, Prof. MUDr. Kristian Hynek, were Czechs, since Slovakia at that time did not have enough educated Slovak speakers who could serve as faculty members. In spite of personnel, financial, and space difficulties, the university developed research and teaching programs. The Faculty of Medicine opened in 1919, and was quickly followed by the Faculties of Law and Philosophy in 1921. The Faculty of Philosophy, besides offering programs in the humanities and social science, also educated much-needed teachers for Slovakia's high schools.

In 1937, a new university building for the Faculties of Law and Philosophy was opened in the centre of Bratislava. The building includes the Aula (hall) used for graduation ceremonies and other formal functions.

During World War II, Slovakia became nominally a republic, but was actually under the sway of Nazi Germany. The government reduced academic freedoms at the university, and the Czech professors were forced out. The university was renamed Slovak University in 1939, though the original name was reinstated in 1954. The Faculty of Science opened in 1940 and the Roman Catholic Faculty of Theology was established in 1941. Academic freedom returned after the end of the war in 1945 but was again cancelled in 1948 as the communists took power in Czechoslovakia, enforcing the ideology of Marxism-Leninism at Czechoslovak universities. The Roman Catholic Faculty of Theology was taken under direct control of the Ministry of Education.

However, the university continued to grow, and new faculties were established (mostly by splitting the existing faculties):
Faculty of Education in 1946,
Faculty of Pharmacy in 1952,
Faculty of Physical Education and Sports in 1960,
Faculty of Medicine in Martin in 1969,
Faculty of Mathematics and Physics in 1980.

After the Velvet Revolution in 1989, the university created a democratic self-government, and mandatory courses on Marxist ideology were abolished. The Roman Catholic Faculty of Theology and the Evangelical Theological Faculty joined the university.

The transformation of Slovakia into a market economy created a need for professionals in management and financial sciences. As a result, the university established the Faculty of Management (1991) and the Faculty of Social and Economic Sciences (2002). In 2000, the European credit transfer system was implemented to improve student mobility and facilitate more ties with other European universities.

List of faculties 
This is a list of faculties of Comenius University in Bratislava with their official English names.

 Faculty of Medicine
 Faculty of Law
 Faculty of Arts
 Faculty of Natural Sciences
 Faculty of Education
 Faculty of Pharmacy
 Faculty of Physical Education and Sport
 Jessenius Faculty of Medicine in Martin
 Faculty of Mathematics, Physics and Informatics
 Faculty of Roman Catholic Theology of Cyril and Methodius
 Evangelical Lutheran Theological Faculty
 Faculty of Management
 Faculty of Social and Economic Sciences

Notable alumni 

 Ľubomír Belák – singer, musician, composer and TV producer
 Emil Benčík –  journalist and translator
 Zuzana Beňušková –  ethnologist
 József Berényi – Chairman of the Party of the Hungarian Coalition
 Robert Fico – politician, former Prime minister of Slovakia
 Rudolf Macúch – Protestant theologian and expert on Mandaean language and Samaritan language
 Zora Mintalová – Zubercová – ethnographer, historian and museologist
 Milan Mišík – geologist and university professor
 Vladimír Palko – former interior minister of Slovakia
 Ladislav Pataki – sports scientist, athletics coach, masters athletics champion
 Julián Podoba – endocrinologist
 Tomáš Raček – actor and diplomat 
 Iveta Radičová – former Prime minister of Slovakia
 Emire Khidayer, diplomat, entrepreneur and writer
 Ernest Valko – assassinated constitutional lawyer 
 Ján Vilček – biomedical scientist, educator, inventor and philanthropist 
 Štefan Znám – mathematician, first to ponder Znám's problem in modern mathematics
 Miroslav Lajcak – diplomat, President of the United Nations General Assembly for the 72nd session
 Zuzana Čaputová – politician, President of Slovakia
 Lukáš Plank - award-winning pathologist specializing in hematopathology.

See also 
 Utrecht Network
 Universitas Istropolitana

References 

 Univerzita Komenského. História, Retrieved in March 2004 
 Univerzita Komenského (2006). Výročná správa za rok 2005 Retrieved in January 2007

External links 

 Official website

 
Educational institutions established in 1919
Education in Bratislava
1919 establishments in Czechoslovakia
John Amos Comenius